Brander Craighead (born September 8, 1990) is a former Canadian football offensive lineman who played two seasons for the Calgary Stampeders of the Canadian Football League (CFL). He was drafted by the Calgary Stampeders in the first round of the 2013 CFL Draft. Craighead played college football at the University of Texas at El Paso and attended Mother Teresa High School in Nepean, Ontario. He also spent time at Fork Union Military Academy in Fork Union, Virginia.

Early years
Craighead played lacrosse for the Mother Teresa High School Titans. The Titan's did not have a football team. He also played city league football for the Nepean Redskins for ten years.

College career
Craighead spent the 2008 season playing football for the Fork Union Military Academy Blue Devils. He transferred to play football for the UTEP Miners.

Professional career
Craighead was drafted by the Calgary Stampeders of the CFL with the seventh pick in the 2013 CFL Draft. He signed with the Stampeders on December 17, 2013. He was made his CFL debut, starting against the Montreal Alouettes, on June 28, 2014. He retired in January 2016.

References

External links
Calgary Stampeders bio 
NFL Draft Scout

Living people
1990 births
Players of Canadian football from Ontario
Canadian football offensive linemen
UTEP Miners football players
Calgary Stampeders players
Sportspeople from Belleville, Ontario